The 1954–55 Hapoel Tel Aviv season was the club's 32nd season since its establishment in 1923, and 7th since the establishment of the State of Israel.

During the season, the club competed in Liga Alef (top division) and the State Cup. In addition, the club played in the privately organized Shapira Cup, a four-club league competition.

Review and events
 
 On 10 October 1954 Udarnik Sofia arrived at Israel on the club's invitation, as a return visit to Hapoel's tour of Bulgaria at the end of the previous season. Udarnik played three matches, against Hapoel XI, a team composed of the best Hapoel affiliated players, against Tel Aviv XI, a mixed Hapoel and Maccabi team, and against Petah Tikva XI, a team mixed Hapoel and Maccabi Petah Tikva team. Udarnik won all three matches. At the end of the tour, as the Bulgarians encountered problems with obtaining visas for a layover in Istanbul, a fourth match was arranged with mixed teams of Udarnik, Hapoel Tel Aviv and Maccabi Jaffa. 
 During December 1954 and January 1955, as no league matches were played due to a dispute between Hapoel, Maccabi and Beitar factions in the IFA, The club organized a league competition for the top Tel Aviv teams, Hapoel, Maccabi, Beitar and Maccabi Jaffa. The competition was played as a double round-robin tournament, with the top placed team winning the cup, named after former Hapoel Tel Aviv treasurer, Yosef Shapira. The club won five matches and lost one, topping the table and winning the cup.
 In early May 1955, Brazilian team Associação Atlética Portuguesa visited Israeli, playing three matches, the second of which was played against Hapoel Tel Aviv. The Brazilians beat Hapoel 4–0. A mixed Maccabi-Hapoel team played against Portuguesa and lost 4–0.

Match results

Legend

Liga Alef
 
League matches began on 6 February 1955, and by the time the season, only 20 rounds of matches were completed, delaying the end of the league season to the next season.

League table (as of 2 July 1955)

Matches

Results by match

State Cup

Shapira Cup

League table

Results

References

 

Hapoel Tel Aviv F.C. seasons
Hapoel Tel Aviv